Qilan (also Romanized as Qīlān) is a village in Vizhenan Rural District, in the Central District of Gilan-e Gharb County, Kermanshah Province, Iran. At the 2006 census, its population was 415, in 83 families.

References 

Populated places in Gilan-e Gharb County